Uki is a village situated near Mount Warning in the Tweed Valley of far northern New South Wales, Australia in the Tweed Shire. Its name may have come from an aboriginal word for "small water plant (like a fern) with a yellow flower and edible root".

There are three approaches to Uki village; from the North it is approximately 15 minutes by road south of the main township of Murwillumbah along the Kyogle Road and 4 km past the turnoff to the World Heritage listed Mount Warning National Park, from the South West along the Kyogle Road from Lismore, Kyogle and Nimbin and from the East along Smiths Creek Road linking Uki to the village of Stokers Siding and the Tweed Valley Way to coastal towns including Brunswick Heads and Byron Bay. It is also possible to travel to Mullumbimby from Uki using gravel back roads and fire trails through the Mount Jerusalem National Park.

Clarrie Hall Dam is located 10 km from Uki, and the area is described as "one of New South Wales’ finest fishing destinations".

Today
Prominent buildings in the village include the historical 'Old Butter Factory' and a primary school.  There are several stores, including a post office, general store, bakery, pharmacy, and laundromat, as well as cafés.  The Mount Warning Hotel is a weekend lunch 'stop-over' for touring motorbikes and those out for a weekend drive.  It burned down in February 2013, but was re-built and was able to re-open in mid-2015.
Uki is the place on which the village of Yurriki in Robert G. Barrett's book The Godson is based.

History
Early pioneers were either timber cutters (usually Australian Red Cedar) or dairy farmers.  Photos of The Sisters and Mt Uki near Uki in the early 1900s show these cleared of nearly all vegetation.

Following a rationalisation of the dairy industry in the 1960s, many farmers stopped their production of milk and turned to beef cattle. This type of farming remains a feature of the region today. Sugarcane farming is a prominent agricultural activity in the Tweed Valley. Tropical fruits have also been grown in the area. The last remaining sawmill is located on Smith's Creek Road, north east of the village.

Demographics

The median age of the Uki population was 45 years, 8 years above the national median of 37.

73.4% of people living in Uki were born in Australia. The other top responses for country of birth were England 6%, New Zealand 3.7%, United States of America 1.3%, Netherlands 0.7%, France 0.5%.

88.5% of people spoke only English at home; the next most common languages were 1.6% German, 0.5% Hebrew, 0.4% French, 0.4% Swedish, 0.4% Spanish.

Sport

The Uki Pythons Soccer Club is located just out of Uki and most of the players are from the village. In 2015, Uki had 2 Senior Men's teams, 1 Senior Women's team, 5 Junior competitive teams (including 1 all girls team) and 6 Junior Miniroos Teams. The club's colours are Dark Green with Yellow trim or Yellow Shirt with Green trim and Dark Green shorts and socks.
Uki also offers community touch football through the summer months.  All teams are local and various levels of ability are represented.  Ages range from 6 to 60.

Notes

External links
 Northern Rivers Geology Blog - Uki

Towns in New South Wales
Suburbs of Tweed Heads, New South Wales